Arenaria serpyllifolia, commonly known as thyme-leaf sandwort, or thyme-leaved sandwort is an annual or biennial  flowering plant in the pink and carnation family Caryophyllaceae.

References

serpyllifolia
Flora of Africa
Flora of Europe
Flora of temperate Asia
Flora of tropical Asia
Plants described in 1753
Taxa named by Carl Linnaeus